Cliniodes ineptalis is a moth in the family Crambidae. It was described by Julius Lederer in 1863. It is found in Venezuela and Colombia.

The length of the forewings is about 24 mm. The forewings are pale brown with greyish-white scales. The costa is pale yellowish brown and the basal area is brownish white. The medial area is pale yellowish brown with scattered black scales and the postmedial area is pale yellowish brown. The hindwings are translucent white with a pale brown marginal band. Adults have been recorded on wing in August and September.

References

Moths described in 1863
Eurrhypini